The Star of the Sea Painted Church in Kalapana, Hawai'i was built in 1927-1928 under the direction of the Belgian Catholic missionary priest Father Evarist Gielen, who painted the upper section of the church interior.

In 1990, the church was moved to its present location just ahead of an advancing lava flow.  It is located on Highway 130 between mile marker 19 and 20. It is on the National Register of Historic Places.

References

External links

Churches on the National Register of Historic Places in Hawaii
Roman Catholic churches in Hawaii
Religious buildings and structures in Hawaii County, Hawaii
Roman Catholic churches completed in 1928
National Register of Historic Places in Hawaii County, Hawaii
20th-century Roman Catholic church buildings in the United States